John Hunter Booth (November 27, 1886 – November 23, 1971) was an American playwright. He wrote seven films between 1922 and 1933.

He was born in New Orleans, Louisiana, United States and died in Norwood, Massachusetts.

Works
The Masquerader (play)

External links

1886 births
1971 deaths
American male screenwriters
20th-century American male writers
20th-century American screenwriters